{{Infobox summit meeting
| summit_name  = 44th G7 summit
| other_titles = 
| logo         = 
| image        = 44th G7 Summit Group Photo.jpg
| alt          = 
| caption      =   
| country      =  Canada
| date         = 8–9 June 2018
| venues       = Fairmont Le Manoir Richelieu, La Malbaie, Quebec, Canada
| cities       = 
| participants = | follows      = 43rd G7 summit
| precedes     = 45th G7 summit
}}
The 44th G7 summit''' was held on 8–9 June 2018, in La Malbaie in the Charlevoix region of Quebec, Canada. This was the sixth time since 1981 that Canada has hosted the meetings.

In March 2014, the Group of Seven (G7)—comprising leaders of Canada, France, Germany, Italy, Japan, the United Kingdom, and the United States—declared that a meaningful discussion was currently not possible with Russia in the context of the G8. Since then, meetings have continued within the G7 process. On the first day of the summit, the United States announced that it would push for the reinstatement of Russia. Italy also requested a restoration of the G8 shortly after. President Trump also pushed for other countries to recognize Crimea as part of Russia, and stated that Ukraine was “one of the most corrupt countries in the world” to G7 leaders.

The summit received much attention due to a significant decline of relations of members with the United States. As a result, the summit was dubbed the “G6+1" by France and some members of the media, signifying the "isolation of the United States” in light of recent events.

Host 
The Fairmont Le Manoir Richelieu in La Malbaie, Quebec, Canada, was chosen as the host of the G7 summit, in part due to its natural beauty and security. It is the first G7 summit to be hosted by Quebec since 1981. La Malbaie, once a resort town that hosted American presidents, required US$465 million in preparations, including new high-speed internet service, new cellphone towers, and security fences. Kelowna, British Columbia, was also considered as a potential host.

Agenda and preparation
In May 2017, Canadian Prime Minister Justin Trudeau stated that he intended to “showcase both its domestic and international priorities: to strengthen the middle class, advance gender equality, fight climate change, and promote respect for diversity and inclusion”.

In June 2017, Peter Boehm was appointed as Deputy Minister for the G7 Summit and Personal Representative of the Prime Minister  after serving as the Canadian G7 Sherpa since 2012.

In December 2017, Trudeau unveiled the summit logo and announced five key themes that Canada would advance once it assumed the Presidency of the G7 on 1 January 2018.

 Investing in growth that works for everyone
 Preparing for jobs of the future
 Advancing gender equality and women's empowerment
 Working together on climate change, oceans and clean energy
 Building a more peaceful and secure world

Economic growth

The notion of ”economic growth that works for everyone” or “equitable growth”, known as 'Croissance Équitable' in French, is rooted in the papal encyclical Rerum Novarum which has had a profound influence on the economic thought of French and Quebecois policy makers—including Pierre Elliott Trudeau and other alumni of the Université de Montréal.

It holds that governments and institutional investors must always have in mind the best interests of employees when making investment decisions—including decent wages and pension benefits. Engaged employee-nominated pension board members are expected to contribute to the development of the equitable investment ethos that will drive this economic approach.

Gender equality
Canadian and French thought leaders have stressed the need to achieve gender equality across all economic sectors by using modern, quantitative managerial tools that can help more precisely measure gender pay gaps and thus inform corrective policy measures at both the corporate and government level. Meeting in Paris, Montreal and Toronto in the weeks leading up to the Charlevoix summit, Canadian and European asset owners and policy makers agreed on the need to step up and assume more responsibility for the advancement of women's rights and other “related social parameters” across all assets classes.

In that perspective, Canadian Prime Minister Justin Trudeau is expected to announce a distinct G7 sustainability initiative focusing specifically on gender diversity across global capital markets—for which "the Canada Pension Plan, OMERS, the Caisse de dépôt et placement du Québec and the Ontario Teachers' Pension Plan are each expected to pitch in [initially] $1 million apiece, with another $5 million from the federal government."

Melinda Gates and Isabelle Hudon served as co-chairs of the Gender Equality Advisory Council created by the Trudeau government for the G7 summit.

Climate change, oceans and clean energy

World Pensions Council (WPC) economist Nicolas J. Firzli has argued that, in spite of the United States withdrawal from the Paris Agreement, the G7-driven process of international consensus-building could still be tilted in favor of renewed cooperation towards the attainment of the Sustainable Development Goals—thanks notably to Justin Trudeau's multilateralist approach and the rapid shift towards ESG-informed investment policies amongst US and Canadian institutional investors.

Declarations issued
The "Charlevoix Commitment on Defending Democracy from Foreign Threats" was one of eight declarations—also known as statements of commitment—issued by the G7 leaders on June 9, 2018. Charlevoix Commitment states that "foreign actors seek to undermine our democratic societies and institutions, our electoral processes, our sovereignty and our security. These malicious, multi-faceted and ever-evolving tactics constitute a serious strategic threat which we commit to confront together, working together with other governments that share our democratic values." The Charlevoix Summit resolved to establish a G7 Rapid Response Mechanism "to strengthen our coordination to identify and respond to diverse and evolving threats to our democracies, including through sharing information and analysis, and identifying opportunities for coordinated response."

Leaders at the summit

The attendees included the leaders of the seven G7 member states as well as representatives of the European Union. The President of the European Commission has been a permanently welcome participant at all meetings and decision-making since 1981.

The 44th G7 summit was the first summit for Italian Prime Minister Giuseppe Conte. It was also the last summit for British Prime Minister Theresa May and Commission President Jean-Claude Juncker.

Participants

Gallery of participating leaders

Invited guests

Heads of government
The following leaders were invited to the Outreach Session of the G7 Summit.

Heads of international organizations
The following heads of international organizations were invited to the Outreach Session of the G7 Summit.

Dispute with Donald Trump

Background 
The summit was dubbed the “G6+1” by the Government of France and political commentators. This resulted from the United States withdrawing from the Joint Comprehensive Plan of Action and from the Paris Agreement, American tariffs, and trade-related disputes between Trump and French President Emmanuel Macron and Canadian Prime Minister Justin Trudeau.

Comments by Donald Trump to Shinzo Abe 
President Trump insulted Japanese Prime Minister Shinzo Abe. He stated he would send 25 million ethnic Mexicans to Japan, saying that “you don't have this problem, but I can send you 25 million Mexicans and you'll be out of office very soon”.

Comments by Donald Trump on Justin Trudeau 
Trump left the summit early in order to travel to Singapore for the United States' first summit with North Korean leader Kim Jong-un. On 9 June 2018, he tweeted that he had instructed the representatives of the United States not to endorse the communique and criticized Justin Trudeau's statements at a news conference following the meeting, calling him “meek and mild” and “dishonest and weak”.

Comments by Peter Navarro 
Trump Advisor Peter Navarro spoke harshly negative words about Canadian Prime Minister Justin Trudeau, saying that there is "a special place in Hell" for Justin Trudeau. He later apologized for the language, but stood behind his statement.

Analysis 
The response of the United States at the G7 received condemnation from foreign policy experts, political scientists, and former diplomats.

Foreign policy expert Ian Bremmer called the summit the “geopolitical equivalent of the Comey firing” and that it will “really damage...important long-term relationship[s]”.

Political scientist Brian Klaas stated that “By attacking allies while championing Russia, Trump made the G-7 summit a disaster—but he fulfilled Vladimir Putin's biggest fantasy. An absolute disgrace”.

Former United States Deputy Secretary of State Strobe Talbott wrote that Donald Trump is “the democratic world's worst nightmare. He has crippled NATO, the North Atlantic community, the European Union and now the G-7. In Putin's zero-sum worldview, that is a dream come true”.

Merkel-Trump stare down photo 
On June 9, Angela Merkel posted a photo of the second day of the G7 meeting on her Instagram account; the caption saying "Day two of the G7 summit in Canada: spontaneous meeting between two working sessions". The image shows Angela Merkel with her hands pressed on the table staring down at Donald Trump, who in turn is staring back while sitting with his arms crossed. The image also showed Shinzo Abe, John Bolton, Theresa May, and Emmanuel Macron surrounding the two leaders, although Abe's "look of uncertainty" was notably singled out. The image was taken by German photographer Jesco Denzel. The photo quickly became viral. Some observers have described the image as something out of a classical painting, with some Twitter users even parodying the image into a painting. Others have used the image as an example to describe the tense G7 meeting, especially with regards to Donald Trump. Similarly, Emmanuel Macron, Donald Trump, Justin Trudeau, Giuseppe Conte, and Shinzo Abe have released their own photos (through their Twitter accounts or their photographers') of the G7 meeting in the same room but taken at different angles and moments. Trump stated that image was taken during a discussion that was "unrelated to anything". He further stated that while the image may seem unfriendly, everyone present were "simply talking".

References

External links

 G7 2018 summit website
 The Charlevoix G7 Summit Communique

2018
2018 conferences
2018 in international relations
2018 in Canadian politics
2018 in Quebec
Diplomatic conferences in Canada
21st-century diplomatic conferences (Global)
June 2018 events in Canada